Aristotelis "Telly" Savalas (January 21, 1922 – January 22, 1994) was an American actor. Noted for his bald head and deep, resonant voice, he is perhaps best known for portraying Lt. Theo Kojak on the crime drama series Kojak (1973–1978) and James Bond archvillain Ernst Stavro Blofeld in the film On Her Majesty's Secret Service (1969).

Savalas' other roles include Birdman of Alcatraz (1962), The Greatest Story Ever Told (1965), Battle of the Bulge (1965), The Dirty Dozen (1967), Kelly's Heroes (1970), Horror Express (1972), Lisa and the Devil (1974) and Escape to Athena (1979). For Birdman of Alcatraz, he was nominated for the Academy Award and Golden Globe for Best Supporting Actor.

As a singer, Savalas released a cover of the Bread song "If", which became a UK No. 1 single in 1975. The song also peaked at number 12 in Australia.

Early life
Aristotelis Savalas was born in Garden City, New York, on January 21, 1922, the second of five children born to Greek parents Christina (née Kapsalis), an artist who was a native of Sparta, and Nick Savalas, a restaurant owner. His paternal grandparents came from the Greek village of Ierakas. Savalas and his brother, Gus, sold newspapers and polished shoes to help support the family. Savalas initially spoke only Greek when he entered grade school, but later learned English. He attended Cobbett Junior High School in Lynn, Massachusetts. He won a spelling bee there in 1934; due to an oversight, he did not receive his prize until 1991, when the school principal and the Boston Herald awarded it to him.

Savalas graduated from Sewanhaka High School in Floral Park, New York in 1940. A renowned swimmer, he worked as a beach lifeguard after graduation from high school. However, on one occasion, he was unsuccessful in saving a father from drowning; as he attempted resuscitation, the man's two children stood nearby crying for their father to wake up. This affected Savalas so much that he spent the rest of his life constantly promoting water safety, and later made all six of his children take swimming lessons.

Military service
In 1941, Savalas was drafted into the United States Army. From 1941 to 1943, Savalas served in Company C, 12th Medical Training Battalion, 4th Medical Training Regiment at Camp Pickett, Virginia. In 1943, he was discharged from the Army with the rank of corporal after being severely injured in a car accident. Savalas spent more than a year recuperating in hospital with a broken pelvis, sprained ankle and concussion. He then attended the Armed Forces Institute where he studied radio and television production.

He received a bachelor's degree in psychology from Columbia's School of General Studies in 1946 and started working on a master's degree while preparing for medical school.

Early career
After the war, he worked for the U.S. State Department as host of the Your Voice of America series, then at ABC News. In 1950, Savalas hosted a radio show called "The Coffeehouse in New York City".

Savalas began as an executive director and then as senior director of the news special events at ABC. He then became an executive producer for the Gillette Cavalcade of Sports, where he gave Howard Cosell his first job in television. Before his acting career took off, Savalas directed Scott Vincent and Howard Cosell in Report to New York, WABC-TV's first regularly-scheduled news program in fall 1959.

Savalas did not consider acting as a career until asked if he could recommend an actor who could do a European accent. He did but as the friend in question could not go, Savalas himself went to cover for his friend and ended up being cast on "And Bring Home a Baby", an episode of Armstrong Circle Theatre in January 1958. He appeared on two more episodes of the series in 1959 and 1960, one, acting alongside a young Sydney Pollack. He was also in a version of The Iceman Cometh.

Savalas quickly became in much demand as a guest star on TV shows, appearing in Sunday Showcase, Diagnosis: Unknown, Dow Hour of Great Mysteries (an adaptation of The Cat and the Canary), Naked City (alongside Claude Rains), The Witness (playing Lucky Luciano in one episode and Al Capone in another), The United States Steel Hour, and The Aquanauts. He was a regular on the short-lived NBC series Acapulco (1961) with Ralph Taeger and James Coburn.

Savalas made his film debut in Mad Dog Coll (1961), playing a cop. His work had impressed fellow actor Burt Lancaster, who arranged for Savalas to be cast in the John Frankenheimer directed The Young Savages (also 1961 and again playing a cop). Pollack worked on the film as an acting coach.

In one of his most acclaimed performances, Savalas reunited with Lancaster and Frankenheimer for Birdman of Alcatraz (1962), where he was nominated for the Academy Award and Golden Globe for Best Supporting Actor. The same year, he appeared as a private detective in Cape Fear (directed by J. Lee Thompson whom Savalas would work with in future films), and The Interns, reprising his role from the latter film in The New Interns (1964).

Savalas also guest starred in a number of TV series during the decade including The New Breed, The Detectives, Ben Casey, The Twilight Zone (the episode "Living Doll"), The Fugitive (1963 TV series) and Arrest and Trial among others.

Baldness and stardom

He continued supporting roles in films such as The Man from the Diners' Club, Love Is a Ball and Johnny Cool (all 1963), Savalas, already at a late stage of male-pattern baldness, shaved his head to play Pontius Pilate in The Greatest Story Ever Told (1965) and kept his head shaven for the rest of his life. He reunited with J. Lee Thompson in John Goldfarb, Please Come Home! (1965), and was one of many names in Genghis Khan (also 1965).

He was part of an all-star cast in The Dirty Dozen (1967), playing Archer Maggott (the worst of the dozen), in a role Jack Palance turned down. He reunited with Burt Lancaster and Sydney Pollack in the Western The Scalphunters (1968), and also featured in the comedy Buona Sera, Mrs. Campbell (also 1968) — noted as one of his favorite roles — and the all-star action movie Mackenna's Gold (1969), his third film for J. Lee Thompson. Savalas attributed his success to "his complete ability to be himself."

Savalas' first leading role in film was in the British crime comedy Crooks and Coronets (1969). The same year he appeared in the James Bond movie On Her Majesty's Secret Service, playing Ernst Stavro Blofeld. He continued to appear in films during the 1970s including Kelly's Heroes (1970) (with Clint Eastwood), Clay Pigeon (1971), and several European features such as Violent City (1970) (with Charles Bronson), A Town Called Bastard (1971), Horror Express (with Peter Cushing and Christopher Lee), A Reason to Live, a Reason to Die, the title role in Pancho Villa (all 1972), and Redneck (1973). He reunited with Christopher Lee in the 1976 thriller Killer Force, and also appeared in Peter Hyams' Capricorn One (1978).

"I had worked my way up to star billing", he later said, "when the bottom dropped out of the movie business. I could have stayed in Europe and made Italian movies but I discovered the big difference between an Italian and American movie is that in the American movie you get paid."

Kojak (1973–1978; 1985–1990)
Savalas first played Lt. Theodopolus "Theo" Kojak in the TV movie The Marcus–Nelson Murders (CBS, 1973), which was based on the real-life Career Girls Murder case.

Kojak was a bald New York City detective with a fondness for lollipops and whose tagline was "Who loves ya, baby?" (He also liked to say, "Everybody should have a little Greek in them.") Although the lollipop gimmick was added in order to indulge his sweet tooth, Savalas also smoked heavily onscreen—cigarettes, cigarillos and cigars—throughout the first season's episodes. The lollipops had apparently given him three cavities, and were part of an (unsuccessful) effort by Kojak (and Savalas himself) to curb his smoking. The critic Clive James explained the lead actor's appeal as Kojak: "Telly Savalas can make bad slang sound like good slang and good slang sound like lyric poetry. It isn't what he is, so much as the way he talks, that gets you tuning in."

David Shipman later wrote: "Kojak was sympathetic to outcasts and ruthless with social predators. The show maintained a high quality to the end, mixing tension with some laughs and always anxious to tackle civic issues, one of its raisons d'etre in the first place. It was required viewing in Britain every Saturday evening for eight years. To almost everyone everywhere Kojak means Savalas and vice versa, but to Savalas himself the series was merely an interval, albeit a long one, in a distinguished career."

Kojak aired on CBS for five seasons from October 24, 1973, until March 18, 1978, with 118 episodes produced. The role won Savalas an Emmy and two Golden Globes for Best Actor in a Drama Series. Co-stars on the show included Savalas' younger brother George as Detective Stavros – a sensitive, wild-haired, quiet, comedic foil to Kojak's street-wise humor in an otherwise dark dramatic series – Kevin Dobson as Kojak's trusted young partner, Det. Bobby Crocker, whose on-screen chemistry with Savalas was a success story of 1970s television, and Dan Frazer as Captain Frank McNeil.

Due to a decline in ratings, the series was canceled by CBS in 1978. Savalas and Frazer were the only actors to appear in all 118 episodes. Savalas was unhappy about the show's demise but got the chance to reprise the Kojak persona in several television movies, starting in 1985. The first film, subtitled The Belarus File and broadcast in February 1985, reunited Savalas with several of his co-stars from the series: younger brother George, Dan Frazer, Mark Russell (Det. Saperstein) and Vince Conti (Det. Rizzo); this marked those actors' final appearances in the Kojak franchise.

A further six Kojak TV movies were produced, titled The Price of Justice (1987), Ariana, Fatal Flaw (both 1989), Flowers for Matty, It's Always Something – with Kevin Dobson reprising his role of Bobby Crocker, now an Assistant District Attorney – and None So Blind (all 1990).

Later career
Savalas wrote, directed and starred in the 1977 independent thriller Beyond Reason. However, the film was not released in cinemas; it was made available only on home media in 1985. Savalas was part of an all-star cast in the movies Escape to Athena (1979), Beyond the Poseidon Adventure (both 1979) and Cannonball Run II (1984), and continued to appear in a number of film and television guest roles during the 1980s, including Border Cop (1980) and Faceless (1988), the series Tales of the Unexpected (1981), and two episodes each of The Love Boat (1985) and The Equalizer (1987): the latter series was produced by James McAdams, who had also produced Kojak.

Savalas was the lead actor in the TV movie Hellinger's Law (1981), which was originally planned as a pilot for a series but ultimately never materialized.

In 1992, he appeared in three episodes of the TV series The Commish (his son-in-law was one of the producers). This was Savalas' final television role. He would appear in two further feature films before his death, Mind Twister (1993) and the posthumous release Backfire! (1995).

Other career achievements
As a singer, Savalas had some chart success. His spoken word version of Bread's "If", produced by Snuff Garrett, reached No. 1 in both the UK and Ireland in March 1975, but just No. 88 in Canada, and his version of Don Williams's "Some Broken Hearts Never Mend" topped the charts in Switzerland in February 1981. He worked with composer and producer John Cacavas on many albums, including Telly (1974) (which peaked at No. 49 in Australia) and Who Loves Ya, Baby (1976).

In the late 1970s, Savalas narrated three UK travelogues titled Telly Savalas Looks at Portsmouth, Telly Savalas Looks at Aberdeen, and Telly Savalas Looks at Birmingham. They were produced by Harold Baim, and were examples of quota quickies, which were then part of a requirement that cinemas in the United Kingdom show a set percentage of British produced films. In the 1980s and early 1990s, Savalas appeared in commercials for the Players' Club Gold Card. In 1982, along with Bob Hope and Linda Evans, he participated in the "world premiere" television ad introducing Diet Coke to Americans. On October 28, 1987, Savalas hosted Return to the Titanic Live, a two-hour television special broadcast from Cité des Sciences et de l'Industrie in Paris. He also hosted the 1989 video UFOs and Channeling.

He received a star on the Hollywood Walk of Fame in 1983. In 1999, TV Guide ranked him number 18 on its 50 Greatest TV Stars of All Time list.

Personal life

Savalas was married three times. In 1948 after his father's death from bladder cancer, Savalas married his college sweetheart, Katherine Nicolaides. Their daughter Christina, named after his mother, was born in 1950. In 1957 Katherine filed for divorce. She urged him to move back to his mother's house during that same year. While Savalas was going broke, he founded the Garden City Theater Center in his native Garden City. While working there he met Marilyn Gardner, a theater teacher. They married in 1960. Marilyn gave birth to their daughter, Penelope, in 1961. A second daughter, Candace, was born in 1963. They divorced in 1974, after a long separation.

In January 1969, while working on the movie On Her Majesty's Secret Service, Savalas met actress Sally Adams (billed as Dani Sheridan, one of Blofeld's "Angels of Death"), an actress 25 years his junior whose daughter from a previous relationship is Nicollette Sheridan. Savalas later moved in with Sally, who gave birth to their son Nicholas Savalas on February 24, 1973. Although Savalas and Sally Adams never legally married, she went by the name Sally Savalas. They stopped living together in December 1978; she filed a palimony lawsuit against him in 1980, demanding support not only for herself and their son, but also for Nicollette.

In 1977, during the last season of Kojak, Savalas met Julie Hovland, a travel agent from Minnesota. The couple were married from 1984 until his death and had two children: Christian, an entrepreneur, singer and songwriter, and Ariana, an actress and singer/songwriter. Savalas was close friends with actor John Aniston, and was godfather to his daughter Jennifer, a successful TV and film actress.

Savalas held a degree in psychology and was a world-class poker player who finished 21st at the main event in the 1992 World Series of Poker. He was also a motorcycle racer and lifeguard. His other hobbies and interests included golfing, swimming, reading romantic books, watching football, traveling, collecting luxury cars, and gambling. He loved horse racing and bought a racehorse with movie director and producer Howard W. Koch. Naming the horse Telly's Pop, it won several races in 1975 including the Norfolk Stakes and Del Mar Futurity.

In his capacity as producer for Kojak, he gave many stars their first break, as Burt Lancaster had done for him. He was considered by those who knew him to be a generous, graceful, compassionate man. He was also a strong contributor to his Greek Orthodox roots through the Saint Sophia and Saint Nicholas cathedrals in Los Angeles and was the sponsor of bringing electricity in the 1970s to his ancestral home, Ierakas, Greece.

Savalas had a minor physical handicap in that his left index finger was deformed. This deformed digit was often indicated on screen; the Kojak episode "Conspiracy of Fear" in which a close-up of Savalas holding his chin in his hand clearly shows the permanently bent finger.

As a philanthropist and philhellene, Savalas supported many Hellenic causes and made friends in major cities around the world. In Chicago, he often met with Illinois state senators Steven G. Nash and Samuel C. Maragos, also of Greek descent, as well as millionaire Simeon Frangos, who owned the Athens North nightclub and the Flying Carpet Hotel near O'Hare Airport.

In 1993, Savalas appeared on an Australian TV show, The Extraordinary, with a paranormal tale where he talked about an experience that he had that he could not explain.

Deaths of relatives and later years
In the 1980s, Savalas began to lose close relatives. His brother George Savalas, who played Stavros in the original series, died in 1985 of leukemia at age 60. His mother, Christina, who had always been his best friend, supporter and devoted parent, died in 1988. On November 22, 1989, Savalas was diagnosed with transitional cell cancer of the bladder.

Death
Savalas died on January 22, 1994, the day after his 72nd birthday, of complications of prostate and bladder cancer at the Sheraton-Universal Hotel in Universal City, California. He had lived at the Sheraton in Universal City for 20 years, becoming such a fixture at the hotel bar that it was renamed Telly's. Savalas was interred at the George Washington section of Forest Lawn – Hollywood Hills Cemetery in Los Angeles, California. The funeral, held in the Saint Sophia Greek Orthodox Church, was attended by his third wife, Julie, and his brother Gus. His first two wives, Katherine and Marilyn, also attended with their own children. The mourners included Angie Dickinson, Nicollette Sheridan, Jennifer Aniston (his goddaughter), Kevin Sorbo, Sally Adams, Frank Sinatra, Don Rickles, and several of Savalas's Kojak co-stars – Kevin Dobson, Dan Frazer, and Vince Conti.

Filmography

Film

Television

Awards and nominations

Discography

Albums
 This is Telly Savalas... (1972)
 Telly (1974)
 Telly Savalas (1975)
 Who Loves Ya Baby (1976)
 Sweet Surprise [released on cassette and CD under the title Some Broken Hearts] (1980)

Singles
"Try to Remember" (1972)
"Look Around You" (1972)
"I Don't Want To Know / I Walk The Line" (1972)
"We All End Up The Same" (1972)
"If" (1974)
"You've Lost That Lovin' Feelin' / Help Me Make It Through the Night" (1974)
"Who Loves Ya Baby" (1975)
"A Good Time Man Like Me Ain't Got No Business Singing The Blues" (1976)
"Sweet Surprise" (1980)
"Some Broken Hearts Never Mend" (1980)
"Lovin' Understandin' Man" (1981)
"Goodbye Madame" (1982)

Notes

References

External links

 
 
 
 
 Telly Savalas on Find A Grave

1922 births
1994 deaths
20th-century American male actors
20th-century American male singers
20th-century American singers
American male film actors
American people of Greek descent
American poker players
American radio personalities
American male stage actors
American male television actors
American television directors
American television personalities
Best Drama Actor Golden Globe (television) winners
Burials at Forest Lawn Memorial Park (Hollywood Hills)
California Democrats
Columbia University School of General Studies alumni
Combat medics
Deaths from bladder cancer
Deaths from cancer in California
Deaths from prostate cancer
Kojak
Male Spaghetti Western actors
MCA Records artists
Military personnel from New York (state)
Outstanding Performance by a Lead Actor in a Drama Series Primetime Emmy Award winners
People from Floral Park, New York
People from Garden City, New York
United States Army non-commissioned officers
United States Army personnel of World War II
20th-century Greek Americans